The Copa Real Federación Española de Fútbol, popularly known as the Copa Federación (Federation Cup) or Copa RFEF, is a Spanish football competition organised by the Royal Spanish Football Federation (RFEF). It has been held since the 1993−94 season as a tournament for smaller football clubs, with a format similar to that of the Copa del Rey.

It is contested annually by clubs from Primera Federación, Segunda Federación and Tercera Federación that have not qualified for the Copa del Rey.

It is currently played in two phases: a first phase of autonomous scope, according to the rules established by each autonomous federation, and a second phase of national scope in which the twenty best teams of the autonomous phase participate –one for each autonomous community, except Andalusia, which has two teams, plus one for Ceuta and one for Melilla– plus five teams from Segunda Federación –the best team from each group in the previous season that did not qualify for the Copa del Rey– plus seven teams from Tercera Federación –ranked second in the previous season, without distinction of groups, with the best coefficient and that did not obtain the right to participate in the Copa del Rey– making a total of 32 teams.

In the national phase, the 32 teams are divided into four groups of eight teams according to proximity criteria, with three single-leg knockout rounds to be played by drawing lots. The winner of each group in the play-offs becomes a semi-finalist to play in the final phase and the four semi-finalists qualify for the Copa del Rey.

The current Copa Federación, created in 1994, is not considered by the RFEF the same as the original one. A similar competition with regional qualification tournaments for amateur clubs (including the affiliated teams of the professional clubs, such as Real Madrid C and FC Barcelona C), the Campeonato de España de Aficionados, operated from 1930 until 1987, but is also considered to be distinct from the Copa Federación.

Finals

Old tournament

Modern tournament

New format

Performances

Performance by club

New tournament

Performance by autonomous community

Regional tournaments

 Andalusia East & Melilla
 Andalusia West & Ceuta
 Aragon
 Asturias
 Balearic Islands
 Basque Country
 Canary Islands
 Cantabria
 Castile and León
 Castile-La Mancha
 Catalonia
 Extremadura
 Galicia
 La Rioja
 Madrid
 Murcia
 Navarre
 Valencian Community

References

External links
List of finals at Rsssf

 
Federacion
Segunda División B
Tercera División